Livewire (Leslie Willis) is a supervillainess appearing in multimedia produced by DC Entertainment, and American comic books published by DC Comics. Created for Superman: The Animated Series, the character appeared in March 1997 in Superman Adventures #5 (based on the animated series). Her first mainstream comic book appearance was in DC Comics' Action Comics #835 (March 2006).

In television, the character was voiced by Lori Petty in Superman: The Animated Series and Maria Canals in Justice League. In live-action Superman-based television series, she has been portrayed by Anna Mae Routledge in Smallville and Brit Morgan in the Arrowverse series Supergirl.

Fictional character biography

DC Animated Universe

Introduced in the Superman: The Animated Series episode "Livewire", Leslie Willis was originally a popular and controversial Metropolis radio shock jock who took cynical joy in attacking Superman during her broadcasts. Amidst a thunderstorm, Willis hosts a rock concert in honor of her third anniversary working as a shock jock in spite of the Metropolis authorities' public safety concerns. When Superman arrives to help the police break up the event, Willis gains support from her fans in attacking him until lightning strikes the stage, setting it on fire. Superman pushes Willis to safety as a second bolt of lightning electrifies a metal tower on the stage, but the electricity runs through his body and into a wire that Willis stepped on, electrocuting her and changing her appearance. After waking up in the hospital and seeing a news report that suggested Superman deliberately caused her transformation, she swears revenge against him and learns she became an electrokinetic metahuman. She escapes from the hospital and confronts Superman, calling herself Livewire. As she battles him, she drains electricity from nearby electronic devices and takes control of the local media before fleeing to a hydroelectric dam, where he douses her in water. Willis is hospitalized once more, though Lex Luthor, who shares her contempt for Superman, pays her hospital bills.

Following this, Willis forms a short-lived alliance with Parasite in the episode "Double Dose" and a separate alliance with Harley Quinn and Poison Ivy in The New Batman Adventures episode "Girls' Night Out", only to be defeated by Superman in the former episode and by Supergirl and Batgirl in the latter.

In the Justice League two-part episode "Hereafter", Willis joins the Superman Revenge Squad to fulfill their eponymous goal, only to be defeated by the Justice League. In the third season of Justice League Unlimited, she joined Gorilla Grodd's Secret Society.

Superman Adventures
Livewire appears in the Superman Adventures comics, which is based on the DCAU animated series. Throughout issue #5, "Balance of Power", the two-part "War Games" (#22–23), and the two-part finale (#65–66), "Power Play", she joins forces with Professor Hamilton to stop Brainiac and eventually reforms.

Comics

In Action Comics #835, Gail Simone and John Byrne brought Livewire into the mainstream DC Universe, in the same tradition as Harley Quinn.

Much like the DCAU version of Livewire before she gained her abilities, she was also a shock jock. Going by the DJ name Leslie, her show was dedicated to bashing upon Superman every night, claiming that Superman was only saving people in the name of grandstanding and showing off. She also shows a disdain for fellow broadcaster Billy Batson, aka Captain Marvel. Her career as a shock jock was cut short when the owner of the station, Miguel, decided to turn the station into a country station (a reference to popular real-world shock jock, Howard Stern, who lost his first DJ job in a similar fashion). Miguel was also quite pleased that she was fired because his wife was saved by Superman.

Unlike the DCAU version of Livewire, she was born with the gift of controlling electricity. Enraged at the loss of her job, she went to the top of the station where she was struck by lightning. Absorbing a large amount of energy from the lightning bolt, her appearance changed to a chalk-white skin with blue hair. With that change, she decided that she would now take her revenge out on Superman.

Superman was weakened by his battle with the Queen of Fables in the previous issue and was unable to withstand Livewire's attacks. Now too weak to fight her directly he defeated her by cunning, shorting out her powers.

Helping to save the world
Livewire gets kidnapped along with most of the other Metahumans on Earth by a being dubbed the 'Auctioneer'. This being scours the universe looking for unique items to acquire (often by theft) before selling them to the highest bidder. Livewire's unique powers allow her, Superman and several other captives to escape their containment fields. She teams up with Nightwing, Superman, the Veteran, Blue Jay and other heroes in fleeing their situation and gaining information.

A dampening field provides a psychological barrier against utilizing their powers. With the help of Mister Terrific, who communicates through Livewire's natural electricity, the field is soon neutralized.

During the escape attempt, Livewire accidentally creates a link between the makeshift team and every single television on Earth. This proves hard to shut off. Soon, the team confronts the Auctioneer. With great difficulty, Livewire gains control over the being's communication systems. Under Superman's suggestions, they threaten to broadcast the Auctioneer's entire database to every alien system possible unless he agrees to release the heroes and leave the Earth alone. He reluctantly does so and returns everyone to Earth. The entire adventure was seen on every Earth TV and due to the Auctioneer selling the dramatic story rights, on many alien planets as well.

During this story arc, she also shows that she is physically attracted to Nightwing.

In Teen Titans (vol. 3) #51, Livewire is shown to be under the control of Starro.

She recently caused a blackout of Gotham City. However, she is easily defeated by Batgirl VI, who was wearing an insulated Batsuit.

During the "Brightest Day" storyline, Livewire is shown battling Wildcat after being possessed by the Starheart.

In the Superman: Grounded storyline, Livewire attacks Jimmy Olsen and takes hostages in Las Vegas to get the attention of Superman. Superman then puts a modified version of the suit he had to wear when he was briefly converted into an energy being on Livewire (who promptly changes the S-shield on it to an L-shield), which returns her power levels to normal. She is arrested, but does not receive a hard sentence as she only damaged property, no one was wounded, and Superman spoke on her behalf. Iron Munro also chooses to use his influence in the justice department to help. When asked by Jimmy why he would help Livewire, Superman says that, in America, everyone deserves a second chance. With the help of Iron Munro and Serling Roquette, an employee of S.T.A.R. Labs, Livewire is declared reformed. She and Munro are given signal watches as part of an ad hoc 'Supermen of America' group that Superman recruits because he comes to understand he cannot be everywhere at once.

The New 52
In 2011, "The New 52" rebooted the DC universe. Livewire appears as a member of the Secret Society of Super Villains after the events of the "Forever Evil" storyline. She has previously faced against Superman, who found himself unable to defeat her, since she is made of pure energy, and teamed up with Batman to do so. Her origin is later given in an issue of Batgirl, where it is revealed that Leslie Willis was once a popular vlogger known for her pranks and makeup tutorials. During a stunt where she tried to reroute all the power in the city to spell out a dirty message that would be visible from space, she was accidentally electrocuted, granting her superhuman abilities.

Powers and abilities
Livewire is a being of pure electricity able to absorb vast quantities from external sources. She can also manipulate electricity, including electric and magnetic fields, ionize the air around her, which the DCAU incarnation used to create her costume, and generate lightning blasts of various intensities, with her strongest being able to weaken or stun Superman. She can also transform into living electricity to travel through anything capable of conducting an electric current, possess/control electronic devices such as computers, telecommunications networks, and an entire electrical grid. In the comics, as stated by Superman in Action Comics #843, Livewire has the ability to broadcast the energy she has stored in the form of a coherent signal (radio wave, etc.), without directing the energy at a target.

Due to her powers, her primary weakness is water, as even a small amount will cause her stored energy to go haywire unless she has stored up enough power. At this or any stage, Livewire would have to be completely drenched in water to be fully depowered. Additionally, silicon dust can also render her powerless due to its electrical resistance. When drained of her electricity, she reverts to her solid form and cannot use most of her abilities until she absorbs a minimal amount of electric power from an appropriate source. However, even when depowered, she can direct the flow of free electricity from an exposed energy source to re-power herself.

In her self-titled Superman: The Animated Series episode, she demonstrated extraordinary strength while lifting a hydroelectric dam's power unit that she was draining at the time.

Other versions

DC Universe Online
Livewire appears in DC Universe Online: Legends, working for Brainiac.

Injustice: Gods Among Us
Livewire appears in the prequel comics for Injustice: Gods Among Us.

In other media

Television

Animation
 Livewire makes a non-speaking cameo appearance in the Teen Titans Go! episode "Black Friday".
 A teenage version of Livewire appears in Young Justice, voiced by Britt Baron. Introduced in the third season episode "Triptych", Simon Stagg uses the Mad Hatter's nanotech to control her as part of his metahuman trafficking ring before Nightwing's team free her. Following this, Livewire became a resident of the Metahuman Youth Center in Taos, New Mexico. As of the fourth season, she has joined the Outsiders.
 Livewire appears in DC Super Hero Girls, voiced by Mallory Low. This version is a teenage bully and internet troll who posts videos and pictures of victims of the pranks she causes with her powers.
 Livewire makes non-speaking cameo appearances in Harley Quinn. This version is a member of the Legion of Doom in season one.

Live-action

 Livewire appears in the Smallville episode "Injustice", portrayed by an uncredited Anna Mae Routledge. This version is a low-time crook. After being incarcerated, she is recruited by Tess Mercer and is tasked with searching for Davis Bloome alongside Parasite, Neutron, Plastique, and Mercer's assistant Eva Greer. Livewire is later killed by an explosive implanted in her head off-screen.
 Livewire appears in Supergirl, portrayed by Brit Morgan. This version is a confident yet abrasive CatCo shock jock who acquires her powers after Supergirl is struck by lightning while rescuing her from a potential helicopter crash. Introduced in her self-titled episode, Livewire attempts to seek revenge on Cat Grant for demoting her, only to be defeated by Supergirl and turned over to the Department of Extranormal Operations (DEO)'s custody. In the episode "Worlds Finest", Silver Banshee breaks Livewire out of the DEO to help her kill Grant, Supergirl, and Kara Danvers. However, the pair are foiled by Supergirl and a group of firefighters and incarcerated at National City's newly developed metahuman prison. In "We Can Be Heroes", scientist Dr. Hampton kidnaps Livewire in an attempt to steal her powers and create an army of electricity-powered super-soldiers, but she escapes with Supergirl's help and they form a truce. In "Fort Rozz", Livewire agrees to help Supergirl and Psi on a mission to the titular prison to gather information on Reign and later dies saving Supergirl.

Film
 An alternate reality version of Livewire appears in Justice League: Gods and Monsters, voiced by Kari Wahlgren. This version is a non-metahuman terrorist armed with an electric beam gun.
 Livewire makes a non-speaking appearance in Teen Titans Go! & DC Super Hero Girls: Mayhem in the Multiverse. This version is a member of the Legion of Doom.

Video games
 Livewire appears as a boss in Superman: Shadow of Apokolips, voiced again by Lori Petty.
 Livewire appears as a boss in Superman: Countdown to Apokolips.
 Livewire appears in DC Universe Online.
 Livewire appears as a summonable character in Scribblenauts Unmasked: A DC Comics Adventure.
 Livewire appears as a playable character in DC Legends.
 Livewire appears in Lego DC Super-Villains, voiced by Cree Summer.
 Livewire appears as a boss in DC Super Hero Girls: Teen Power, voiced again by Mallory Low.

Miscellaneous
Livewire appears in the Harley Quinn animated series spin-off comic series Harley Quinn: The Animated Series: The Eat. Bang! Kill. Tour.

See also
 List of Superman enemies
 Superman: The Animated Series
 DC Animated Universe

References

External links
 Comic Book Character Database
 Livewire bio on the official Superman/Batman Adventures homepage.
 Livewire on the DC Animated Universe Wiki

1997 comics debuts
Villains in animated television series
Comics characters introduced in 1997
Comics characters introduced in 2006
Characters created by Bruce Timm
DC Animated Universe original characters
DC Comics characters who are shapeshifters
DC Comics characters who can teleport
DC Comics female superheroes
DC Comics female supervillains
DC Comics metahumans
Female characters in animation
Fictional characters with electric or magnetic abilities
Fictional radio personalities
Fictional technopaths
Superman characters